"The Longest Night" is a ballad number performed by the Bee Gees, with lead vocals by Robin Gibb. This song was written by Barry Gibb, Robin Gibb and Maurice Gibb, and was released in September 1987, from the album E.S.P..

Musical structure
On this song, it features Robin Gibb on the lead vocal, with Barry's guitar all over it; the variety of the melody, the flow of the lyric, and the structure with two verses but no chorus all set a contemplative mood. The second time around, as it hits the second verse section, Robin goes off into a few lines of new melody as if he's been distracted by his thoughts. Barry chimes in with his falsetto voice for backing vocals. The musicians who played on this song were Barry Gibb and Nick Moroch on guitar, Maurice Gibb and Robbie Kondor on keyboards, drums programmed by Rhett Lawrence and Marcus Miller on bass. In 1989, the song was performed live in Rotterdam as part of the One For All Tour. In 2008, Robin mimed to the song on a UK show.

Personnel
 Robin Gibb – lead vocal
 Barry Gibb – backing vocal, guitar
 Maurice Gibb – backing vocal, keyboards
 Robbie Kondor – keyboards
 Rhett Lawrence – drum programming
 Marcus Miller – bass
 Nick Moroch – guitar

References

1987 songs
Bee Gees songs
Songs written by Barry Gibb
Songs written by Robin Gibb
Songs written by Maurice Gibb
Song recordings produced by Barry Gibb
Song recordings produced by Robin Gibb
Song recordings produced by Maurice Gibb
Song recordings produced by Arif Mardin